Pyrinomonas is a genus of bacteria, containing the only species Pyrinomonas methylaliphatogenes.

References

Bacteria described in 2014
Acidobacteriota